The ciliary neurotrophic factor receptor, also known as CNTFR, binds the ciliary neurotrophic factor.  This receptor and its cognate ligand support the survival of neurons.  This receptor is most closely related to the interleukin-6 receptor.   This receptor possesses an unusual attachment to the cell membrane through a glycophosphatidylinositol linkage.

Model organisms

Model organisms have been used in the study of CNTFR function. A conditional knockout mouse line, called Cntfrtm1a(EUCOMM)Wtsi was generated as part of the International Knockout Mouse Consortium program — a high-throughput mutagenesis project to generate and distribute animal models of disease to interested scientists.

Male and female animals underwent a standardized phenotypic screen to determine the effects of deletion. Twenty five tests were carried out on mutant mice and one significant abnormality was observed: no homozygous mutant animals were observed at weaning. The remaining tests were therefore carried out on adult heterozygous mutant animals, but no further abnormalities were seen.

References

External links
 

Genes mutated in mice